Tours de Levallois are two office skyscrapers which have been approved to be built in Levallois-Perret, in the inner suburbs of Paris, France.

The towers, which are planned to be delivered by 2009, will be 165 meter tall. They will be located above a 3-storey shopping mall under which will be built a car park with a capacity of 1,600 vehicles. The towers in themselves, of identical design, will be dedicated to host strictly corporate offices.

The former buildings which used to occupy the land on which those towers will be built have been demolished during the month of September 2006. The preparation phase should start by March 2007, and the construction of the building in itself should have started in August 2007. Construction should have taken 3 years for a final delivery in 2010.

In 2008 Mohamed Bin Issa Al Jaber was presented as the new investor behind the project. Construction was suspended in the following months due to payment delays. In February 2011 the city of Levallois was seeking new investors. It filed a complaint against Al Jaber, which resulted in Al Jaber's planning application to be revoqued. The land allocated to the project was then bought back by investment bank BNP Paribas, which intends to make offices instead of the towers.

In September 2011, Levallois citizens were informed that a new project was scheduled: 2 skyscrapers in the town centre. A 134 meter tall tower near the Pont de Levallois metro station, and a 190m tower close to the Clichy-Levallois train station.
Those buildings being far taller than the Levallois skyline, thousands of citizens are struggling against the project to avoid more traffic jams, pollution, noise, and all other problems induced. Levallois already has the highest population density in Europe and transports and roads are overcrowded.

See also 
 Skyscraper
 List of tallest structures in Paris

External links 
 Tours de Levallois (Bati-actu)

References 

Levallois